Waysiders Drumpellier is a rugby union side based in Coatbridge, North Lanarkshire, Scotland. The club was founded in 1993 by the merger of Waysiders RFC and Drumpellier RFC. They play their home games at Langloan in Coatbridge.

History

Waysiders Drumpellier was born in 1993 for the 1993–94 season. It was a merger of two sides:- Waysiders RFC of Airdrie; and Drumpellier of Coatbridge.

The merger made Waysiders Drumpellier the rugby club with the largest school catchment area in Scotland; featuring 7 Secondary Schools and 52 Primary Schools.

The club run a 1st and 2nd XV as well as girls and boys sides. They also plan a rugby academy. The club had a women's side; it fell away, though the club is keen to re-instate this. However former Waysider Drumpellier players Tanya Griffiths, Emma Waugh, Heather Law, Lauren Miller and Jennifer Miller have all went on to represent Scotland.

The club recently secured over £108,000 in funding from the SRU and Sport Scotland for new changing rooms to allow for boys, girls, men and women. They have also received funding from Ross and Liddell's Community Bursary Scheme.

Waysiders Drumpellier Sevens

The club runs the Waysiders Drumpellier Sevens. The tournament started in 1994. Before this Drumpellier RFC ran the Drumpellier Sevens until 1993.

Notable former players

Men

Scotland 'A'

The following former Waysiders Drumpellier players represented Scotland 'A'.

Glasgow Warriors

The following former Waysiders Drumpellier players represented Glasgow Warriors.

Women

Scotland

The following former Waysiders Drumpellier players represented Scotland.

Honours

 West Division 3
 Champions: 2018-19
 McLaren HSFP Sevens
 Champions: 1996

References 

Rugby union in North Lanarkshire
Scottish rugby union teams
Coatbridge